Alexander Vladimirovich Popov (born 10 January 1984) is a Russian former pair skater. He teamed up with Arina Ushakova in 2000. After training under Liudmila Kalinina, they moved to the husband-and-wife team of Valentina and Valeri Tiukov, who coached them in Perm. Ushakova/Popov won four medals on the JGP series – one gold, two silver, and one bronze – and qualified twice for the JGP Final. Their partnership ended in 2005.

Results 
JGP: Junior Grand Prix

With Ushakova

Programs 
(with Ushakova)

References

External links 
 
 Tracings.net profile

Russian male pair skaters
Living people
1984 births
Sportspeople from Perm, Russia